The 1969 Boise State Broncos football team represented Boise State College during the 1969 NAIA football season, the second season of Bronco football at the four-year level. It was Boise's final season as an NAIA independent before joining the Big Sky Conference and 

The Broncos played their home games on campus at the original Bronco Stadium in Boise, Idaho. This was the final year for this wooden iteration, constructed in 1950, and the Broncos' last season for home games on natural grass. Immediately following the end of the season, the venue was razed and a new concrete stadium was built in less than ten months for the start of the 1970 season, outfitted with AstroTurf (green for sixteen seasons, until 1986).

Led by second-year head coach Tony Knap, the Broncos finished with a  record.

Schedule

NFL Draft
One Bronco was selected in the 1970 NFL Draft, which lasted seventeen rounds (442 selections).

References

Boise State
Boise State Broncos football seasons
Boise State Broncos football